The Opperhoofd of Mauritius was an official who ruled Dutch Mauritius (now Republic of Mauritius) during the Dutch colonial period between 1598 and 1718. The island was under the administration of the Dutch East India Company.

List of Opperhoofds (1598–1710)
A list of Opperhoofd of Mauritius from 1598 to 1710.

See also
 Governor of Mauritius

References

Mauritius
 
Dutch Mauritius
Lists of political office-holders in Mauritius